The Roman Catholic Diocese of Tura is a diocese located in the city of Tura in the Ecclesiastical province of Shillong in India.

History
 March 1, 1973: Established as Diocese of Tura from the Metropolitan Archdiocese of Shillong–Gauhati

Bishops
 Bishops of Tura (Latin Rite)
 Bishop Oreste Marengo, S.D.B. (Apostolic Administrator June 26, 1969 – January 12, 1979)
 Bishop George Mamalassery (January 12, 1979 – April 21, 2007)
 Bishop Andrew Marak (April 21, 2007 – present)

Coadjutor Bishop
Andrew Marak (2004-2007)

Auxiliary Bishop
Jose Chirackal (2020-)

Saints and causes for canonisation
 Servant of God Bishop Oreste Marengo, SDB

References

External links
 GCatholic.org 
 Catholic Hierarchy 

Tura
Christianity in Meghalaya
Tura, Meghalaya
Tura
Roman Catholic dioceses and prelatures established in the 20th century
1973 establishments in Meghalaya